Mind Game (simplified Chinese: 心迷) is a Malaysian television drama series produced by MediaCorp Studios Malaysia in 2014, starring Tay Ping Hui, Joanne Peh, Zhang Yaodong and Paige Chua as the main characters of the series. A man's search for his long-lost sister unravels more mysteries when he finds his sister but eventually learns that she is an imposter. As of 17 June 2015, all 30 episodes of Mind Game have aired on MediaCorp Channel 8.

Episodic Guide

See also
Mind Game
List of MediaCorp Channel 8 Chinese Drama Series (2010s)

References

Lists of Singaporean television series episodes
Lists of Malaysian television series episodes
Lists of action television series episodes
Lists of crime television series episodes